Kvist is a surname of Scandinavian origin.

People with the surname include:
 John Kvist (born 1899), Swedish player of American football
 Jon Kvist (born 1967), Danish academic
 Lars Kvist, Swedish footballer
 Per Kvist (1890–1947), Norwegian writer and actor
 Thomas Kvist (born 1987), Danish road bicycle racer
 William Kvist (born 1985), Danish footballer

See also 
 Quist
 Qvist

Kvist is also the name of a Norwegian melodic black metal band that existed from 1993 until 1996.